Frank Ross McCoy (October 29, 1874 – June 4, 1954) was a United States Army officer. He served in the Philippines, during World War I, and led an American relief mission to Tokyo after the 1923 earthquake. He retired from military service in 1938. In his civilian career, he was president of the Foreign Policy Association and chairman of the Far Eastern Commission.

Early life 
McCoy was born in Lewistown, Pennsylvania on October 29, 1874, the son of Margaret Eleanor (Ross) McCoy and Thomas Franklin McCoy. a veteran of the Mexican–American War and American Civil War who attained the rank of brigadier general by brevet. He graduated from Lewistown High School in 1891, then attended the United States Military Academy. He graduated in 1897, received his commission as a second lieutenant and was assigned to the 8th Cavalry.

Military career 
McCoy served on the western front in Cuba, in the Philippines, and in the Santiago campaign. In Cuba and in the Philippines, he acted as aide to General Leonard Wood and was for several years aide to President Theodore Roosevelt after his promotion to major general.

In 1911, McCoy was appointed a member of the General Staff and, in 1917, became a member of the General Staff of the American Expeditionary Forces in Europe, where he commanded the 165th Infantry Regiment in 1918. McCoy wrote Principles of Military Training (1917).

From 1918 to 1919, McCoy was Director of Transportation in the American Expeditionary Force. In 1919, he served as chief of staff in the United States military mission to Armenia. He led a relief mission to Tokyo after the 1923 earthquake. From 1926 to 1929, he commanded the 3rd Infantry Brigade and the 1st Field Artillery Brigade. From 1932 to 1933, he served on the Lytton Commission investigating the Japanese military invasion and occupation of Manchuria.  From 1933 to 1935, McCoy commanded the Seventh Corps Area.

McCoy served as interim commander of First United States Army in 1938, and was succeeded by James K. Parsons. He retired on October 31, 1938, but was recalled between 1941 and 1942 to serve on the Roberts Commission.

Civilian career 
After the war, McCoy became the chairman of the Far Eastern Commission, an international body created to determine the fate of postwar Japan.  He was also a member of the Pennsylvania Society of the Sons of the Revolution.

Awards
McCoy received the Army Distinguished Service Medal with oak leaf cluster, and two Silver Star Citations. The citation for his first Army DSM reads:

The second DSM citation reads:

Death 
McCoy died on June 4, 1954 at Walter Reed Army Medical Center.

His birthplace, the McCoy House, was added to the National Register of Historic Places in 1973. His papers are held by the Library of Congress.

References

External links

 
 Diplomat in Khaki: Major General Frank Ross McCoy and American Foreign Policy, 1898–1949, Andrew Bacevich, 1989, 

1874 births
1954 deaths
People from Lewistown, Pennsylvania
Military personnel from Pennsylvania
American military personnel of the Spanish–American War
United States Army personnel of World War I
United States Army generals
United States Military Academy alumni
Burials at Arlington National Cemetery
Military aides to the President of the United States
United States Army Cavalry Branch personnel